AS Citadele banka is a Latvian bank and financial and asset manager. The principal market of operation for the Citadele Group is the Baltic States. 
Citadele was the exclusive cooperation partner of American Express in Latvia and Lithuania, possessing the right to issue American Express payment cards until 1 December 2016.

Citadele banka is the parent company of a Group offering banking, financial and private capital management services in its home market and through its international presence.

Citadele is one of two institutions created in 2010 from a state administered split of Parex Bank into viable and distressed banking assets. The other is Reverta. Parex was privately founded 1992 and taken over by the Latvian government on 8 November 2008 during the Financial crisis of 2007–2010. The bad bank assets remained with Parex, now renamed Reverta.

Name 
The name Citadele is drawn from the Italian word “citadella” meaning a small city, a powerful fortress, and the main fortification at the heart of the feudal city which also serves as the administrative and cultural centre. The headquarters of the Citadele  Group is located at 2a Republic Square, Riga.

Ownership
An international group of investors represented by Ripplewood Advisors LLC together with 12 reputable investors own 75% plus one of Citadele banka's shares after its re-privatization by the Latvian government. The European Bank for Reconstruction and Development (EBRD) continues to own 25% minus one of the bank's shares.

References

External links 
 https://www.citadele.lv/ Citadele banka
 https://www.citadele.ee/ Citadele banka in Estonia
 https://www.citadele.lt/ Citadele bankas in Lithuania
 https://www.cblgroup.com/ Citadele Group
 Citadele Banka

Banks of Latvia
Banks established in 2010
Companies based in Riga
Latvian companies established in 2010